Rhadinastis loraria is a moth in the family Cosmopterigidae. It was described by Edward Meyrick in 1917. It is found in India.

References

Cosmopteriginae
Moths described in 1917